Nyctemera gerra is a moth of the family Erebidae first described by Charles Swinhoe in 1903. It is found on Sulawesi, the Sangihe Islands, the Talaud Islands, the Philippines and Sanana Island.

References

Nyctemerina
Moths described in 1903